Dehalococcoidia is a class of Chloroflexota, a phylum of Bacteria. It is also known as the DHC group.

The name Dehalococcoidetes is a placeholder name given by Hugenholtz and Stackebrandt, 2004, after Dehalococcoides ethenogenes, a partially described species in 1997, whereas the first species fully described belonging to this class was Dehalogenimonas lykanthroporepellens by Moe et al. 2009, but no emendations to the name were made.

Characteristics
Both species, Dehalococcoides ethenogenes and Dehalogenimonas lykanthroporepellens are irregular coccus (coccoid) bacteria capable of dehalogenating polychlorinated aliphatic alkanes and alkenes, such as tetrachloroethene, trichloropropane, trichloroethane, dichloropropane, and dichloroethane.

One of the features of the members of the phylum Chloroflexota is the unusual cell wall structure, which is monoderm but with great variation in presence or structure of the peptidoglycan resulting in many members staining Gram-negative and other Gram-positive.
Both species of Dehalococcoidetes stain Gram negative, but they potentially lack peptidoglycan and instead possess pseudopeptidoglycan (S-layer) (resistant to peptidoglycan-attacking antibiotics ampicillin and vancomycin; wheat germ agglutinin does not bind nor does lysozyme work).

See also
Bioaugmentation

References

 
Chloroflexota